The Chief Election Commissioner of India heads the Election Commission of India, a body constitutionally empowered to conduct free and fair elections to the national and state legislatures and of President and Vice-President. This power of the Election Commission of India is derived from the Article 324 of the Constitution of India. Chief Election Commissioner of India is usually a member of the Indian Civil Service and mostly from the Indian Administrative Service. It is very difficult to remove the authority of the Chief Election Commissioner once appointed by the president, as two-thirds of the Lok Sabha and the Rajya Sabha need to present and vote against him for disorderly conduct or improper actions.

India was among the early countries to use a completely electronic ballot in the parliamentary elections in 2014, which the Election Commission of India implemented across India's large and diverse population with many rural illiterate people.

While the office has always been an important one in the machinery of the Indian political process, it gained significant public attention during the tenure of T.N. Seshan, from 1990 to 1996. Seshan is widely credited with undertaking a zealous effort to end corruption and manipulation in Indian elections.

Suggested reforms 

In June 2012, Lal Krishna Advani, a veteran Indian politician and former Deputy Prime Minister of India (as well as former Leader of the Opposition in Indian Parliament), suggested that appointment of CEC (as well as the Comptroller and Auditor General of India (CAG)) should be made by a bipartisan collegium consisting of the Prime Minister, the Chief Justice, the Law Minister and the Leaders of the Opposition in the Lok Sabha and the Rajya Sabha. Subsequently, M Karunanidhi, the head of Dravida Munnetra Kazhagam (DMK) party and five times Chief Minister of Tamil Nadu supported the suggestion. Advani made this demand to remove any impression of bias or lack of transparency and fairness because, according to him, the current system was open to "manipulation and partisanship". Similar demand was made by many former CEC's such as B B Tandon, N Gopalaswamy and S Y Quraishi.

Compensation 

By the "Election Commission (Condition of Service of Election Commissions And Transaction of Business) Act, 1991", the salary of the chief election commissioner is the same as salary of a Judge of Supreme Court of India. If there are other election commissioners appointed by the President to help the chief election commissioner, they also receive the same salary.

List of Chief Election Commissioners
The following have held the post of the Chief Election Commissioner of India.

References

External links